Emil Jones III (born May 16, 1978) is the Illinois State Senator  for the 14th Senate District since 2010. The 14th district covers all or parts of Palos Heights, Oak Forest, Crestwood, Blue Island, Alsip, Midlothian, and Riverdale. Jones is the son of former Illinois Senate President Emil Jones.

Electoral career
In the midst 2008 election season, Jones' father, Illinois Senate president Emil Jones, Jr., vacated the 14th Legislative District Illinois Senate seat in August, after the February 5 primary had already passed; son Jones III was appointed as Democratic candidate and won the November 2008 general election.

Jones was re-elected to the Illinois Senate in 2012, 2016 (to a 2-year term), and 2018, running unopposed in each election.

Illinois State Senate
As of July 2022, Jones is a member of the following Illinois Senate committees:

 Appropriations - Business Regulations and Labor Committee (SAPP-SBRL)
 Energy and Public Utilities Committee (SENE)
 Financial Institutions Committee (SFIC)
 (Chairman of) Licensed Activities Committee (SLIC)
 Public Safety Committee (SPUB)
 Redistricting Committee (SRED)
 Redistricting - Chicago South Committee (SRED-SRCS)
 Transportation Committee (STRN)

Jones also serves as the Treasurer for the Illinois Legislative Black Caucus.

In September 2022, Jones was indicted on three felony charges, including bribery and lying to federal agents in connection with a scandal involving a company that provides red light cameras for the state of Illinois. Jones pled not guilty to the charges. Illinois Governor J. B. Pritzker called for Jones to resign his seat.

Personal life
Jones is the son of former Illinois Senate President Emil Jones Jr. and Patricia Jones. He graduated from Chicago Christian High School before attending Chicago State University and Robert Morris College but did not receive a degree from either institution. He is Roman Catholic.

Before becoming a State Senator, Jones served as an administrator at the Illinois Department of Commerce and Economic Opportunity.

References

External links
Biography, bills and committees at the 98th Illinois General Assembly
By session: 98th, 97th, 96th
Illinois State Senator Emil Jones III legislative website
 
Friends of Emil Jones III campaign committee filings (including donors) at the Illinois State Board of Elections
Citizens for Emil Jones campaign committee filings (including donors) at the Illinois State Board of Elections — father's campaign fund; Jones III was treasurer until 2014

1978 births
Living people
Chicago State University alumni
Robert Morris University Illinois alumni
African-American Catholics
African-American state legislators in Illinois
Politicians from Chicago
Democratic Party Illinois state senators
21st-century American politicians
Catholics from Illinois
21st-century African-American politicians
20th-century African-American people